Code page 1105 (CCSID 1105), also known as CP1105, is an IBM code page number assigned to the Denmark/Norway variant of DEC's National Replacement Character Set (NRCS). The 7-bit character set was introduced for DEC's computer terminal systems, starting with the VT200 series in 1983, but is also used by IBM for their DEC emulation. Similar but not identical to the series of ISO 646 character sets, the character set is a close derivation from ASCII with only ten code points differing.

Code page layout

See also
 Code page 1107 (alternate Denmark/Norway NRCS)
 Code page 1017 (similar ISO-646-DK code page)
 National Replacement Character Set (NRCS)

References

1105